The Minister for Customer Service and Digital Government is a minister in the Government of New South Wales responsible for administering legislation and policy in relation to the state's revenues, consumer affairs regulations, innovation policy, property and housing administration, co-operative societies, and government records in New South Wales, Australia. The minister's responsibilities also include matters relating to government services and service delivery, and their improvement.

The current Minister for Customer Service and Digital Government is Victor Dominello, since 2 April 2019,  having previously served as the Minister for Finance, Services and Property from January 2017 until April 2019. The minister is assisted in that role by Eleni Petinos, the Minister for Fair Trading, appointed with effect from 21 December 2021.

Together, the ministers administer their portfolio through the Customer Service cluster, in particular the Department of Customer Service, Service NSW, the Office of Fair Trading, the State Records Authority, NSW Registry of Births, Deaths and Marriages, Liquor & Gaming NSW, and a range of other government agencies.

Ultimately the ministers are responsible to the Parliament of New South Wales.

List of ministers

Customer service and digital government 
The following individuals have served as Minister for Customer Service and Digital Government, or any precedent titles:

See also 

List of New South Wales government agencies

Notes

References

External links
 New South Wales Finance, Services and Innovation

Customer Service
New South Wales